This is a list of sheriffs of Middlesex.

History of the office
From c. 1131 to 1889 there was no separate sheriff for the county. By a charter of Henry I the livery of the City of London were given the right to elect two sheriffs of "London and Middlesex" on a payment of £300 per annum to the Crown. This continued until 1889, when the Local Government Act 1888 came into force. A single High Sheriff of Middlesex was thereafter appointed in the same manner as other English counties. At the same time, the most populous parts of Middlesex were included in the new County of London, which had its own high sheriff.

The office ceased to exist in 1965, when Middlesex was abolished. The majority of the area became part of the jurisdiction of the High Sheriff of Greater London.

List of sheriffs

1044: Esgar the Staller
1066: Geoffrey de Mandeville
 Roger de Rames
1103: Hugh of Buckland

1131–1888

See List of Sheriffs of London

1889–1899
Note: the years shown are the shrieval years. Sheriffs were appointed at a meeting of the privy council generally held in February or March and held office until the similar meeting in the next year. For example, high sheriff appointed in March 1892 "for the year 1892" held office until March 1893.
1889: Colonel Edward John Stracey-Clitherow, of Boston House, Brentford
1890: Colonel Charles Edward Gostling-Murray, of Whitton Park, Hounslow
1891: Sir John Gibbons, 5th Baronet, of Stanwell Place, Staines, Bt.
1892: Edward Montague Nelson of Hanger Hill House, Ealing
1893: Lieutenant-Colonel William Horatio Harfield of Sunbury Court, Sunbury
1894: Thomas Francis Blackwell of The Cedars, Harrow Weald
1895: August Christoph Rudolf de Wette of Hampton House, Hampton Court
1896: Walter Barnard Byles of Harefield House, Harefield
1897: Lieutenant-Colonel Bernard Tindal Bosanquet of Fairholme, Teddington
1898: Irwin Edward Bainbridge Cox of Moat Mount, Mill Hill

1899–1909
1899: Francis Augustus Bevan of Trent Park, Enfield
1900: John Walker Ford of Enfield Old Park, Winchmore Hill
1901: Frederick Cox of Harefield Place, Harefield
1902: Cory Francis Cory-Wright of Northwood, Hornsey Lane
1903: Lieutenant Alfred Henry Tarleton of Breakspears, Uxbridge
1904: Joseph Edward Lilley of The Chestnuts, Wealdstone
1905: Cecil Fane De Salis of Dawley Court, Uxbridge
1906: Alexander Keith Carlyon of Mount Park, Harrow
1907: Thomas Croysdale of Hawke House, Sunbury
1908: Sir George Barham of Sudbury Park, Wembley

1909–1919
1909: Edward Otter of Stanhope Park, Greenford
1910: Edward Moore of 19 Cumberland Terrace, Regent's Park
1911: Sir William John Crump of Glenthorn, Harrow Weald
1912: Arthur Nockolds Gilbey of Swakeleys, Uxbridge
1913: Philip William Poole Carlyon-Britton of Hanham Court, Gloucestershire and 43 Bedford Square, London SW
1914: George Acton Davis of Julian Hill, Harrow on the Hill
1915: Gibbons Grinling of Fairfield, Harrow Weald
1916: George William Barber of Park House, Englefield Green, Surrey
1917: Henry Burt of 15 Albert Court, Kensington Gore, London SW
1918: Stanley Marseille Dent of 13 Westbourne Street, Hyde Park, London W

1919–1929
1919: Edward Laurence Hamilton of the Cedars, South Mimms
1920: John William Burton of 15 Collingham Gardens, SW5
1921: John McEwan of Carisbrooke, Enfield
1922: Alfred William Perkin of Greenford Green, Harrow
1923: John Maitland of Blythwood, Enfield
1924: Alfred Hollington of The Cottage, The Ridgeway, Potters Bar
1925: Henry Walter Peal of Oakhurst, St Stephen's Road, Ealing
1926: Colonel Cecil Henry Pank of Westfield, Hadley Wood
1927: Percy Barlow of Torkington House, Acton
1928: Colonel Sir Henry Ferryman Bowles of Forty Hill, Enfield, Baronet.

1929–1939
1929: Major Sir William Henry Prescott of Allington House, White Hart Lane, Tottenham
1930: Lieutenant-Colonel Sir Charles Pinkham of 127 Dartmouth Road, Cricklewood
1931: James Warren of Capel House, Bullsmoor Lane, Waltham Cross
1932: Lieutenant-Colonel Montagu Francis Markham Sloane Kittoe of Leafland, Harrow on the Hill
1933: John Smyth Crone, of Castlereagh, Cleveland Road, W13
1934: Forrester Clayton, of 7 Gunnersbury Avenue, Ealing
1935: Colonel Edwin James King of the Old House, East Finchley
1936: George James Furness of Roundwood House, Willesden
1937: Sir Howard Stransom Button of The Cedar House, Hillingdon
1938: Colonel Augustus Mervyn Owen Anwyl-Passingham of 34 St. Leonard's Terrace, London SW3

1939–1949
1939: George James Barnard Furness of Sheridan, Grimms Hill, Great Missenden, Buckinghamshire (son of 1936 high sheriff)
1940: Sir Gilfrid Gordon Craig of The Grange, Hillingdon
1941: William Micah Bolton of "Meloch", Harlesden Road, NW10
1942: Lieutenant-Colonel Robert Walker Roylance of 6 Wellesley House, Lower Sloane Street SW1
1943: John William Catlow of 148 Anson Road, Cricklewood, NW2
1944: Group Captain Alan Sydney Whitehorn Dore of Eastcote Point, Cuckoo Hill, Pinner
1945: Rowland Richard Robbins of Hollycroft, Sipson, West Drayton
1946: Clement Edward Page Taylor of Woodthorpe, 37 Stonebridge Park, NW10
1947: Colonel Robert Robertson Kimmitt, O.B.E., T.D., of 8, Cleveland Road, Ealing, W.13.
1948: Brevet-Colonel Maurice Browne, M.C,. Middlesex Regiment, Inglis Barracks, Mill Hill, N.W.7.

1949–1959
1949: George Weston of 10, Sutherland Avenue, Paddington W.9.
1950: Herbert John Nias, M.B.E., of Aysgarth, College Road, Isleworth
1951: John Donaldson Craig of Old Manor Cottage, Park Road, Teddington
1952: Harold Walter Jones of 10, The Paddocks, Wembley Park, Wembley
1953: Major Arthur John Lewer, O.B.E., of Boundary House, Green Walk, Norwood Green, Southall
1954: William Reginald Clemens of 90, Beaufort Park, Hampstead Garden Suburb, N.W.11.
1955: Charles William Skinner of 96, Alderman's Hill, Palmers Green, N.13.
1956: Arthur Hillier, O.B.E., of 31, Arlington House, Arlington Street, S.W.1.
1957: Charles Bennett Baggs, of Laurel Bank, Holders Hill Road, Hendon, N.W.4.
1958: Sir (Stanley) Graham Rowlandson, M.B.E., of 16, Welbeck Street, London W.1.

1959–1965
1959: Herbert Charles Nias, of "Whyte Leafe", The Ridgeway, Fetcham, Surrey.
1960: Sir Christopher George Armstrong Cowan, Kt., of Kiln Farm, Rickmansworth Road, Northwood.
1961: Lieutenant-Colonel Alfred James Ross, of Frethun Cottage, 20 Grimsdyke Crescent, Barnet, Hertfordshire
1962: Major George Robert Hesketh Wrangham, of 26 The Avenue, Ealing, London W.13.
1963: Colonel Sir Joseph Henry Haygarth, Kt., C.B.E, of "Braeside", Manor Park Gardens, Edgware.
1964: Frederick John Charles Ingram of 52 Vivian Way, Deansway, London N.2.
1965 onwards: See High Sheriff of Greater London

See also
Sheriffs of the City of London

References

 
Middlesex
History of local government in Middlesex